Paul Sass (born 4 August 1988) is a retired English mixed martial artist who competed in UFC's and Bellator's Lightweight division.

Mixed martial arts career

Early career
Sass' professional record stands at 14–2 with eight of the victories by triangle choke and one by triangle armbar. These nine triangle victories have earned him a world submission record.
His penultimate fight on the domestic circuit was against Rob Sinclair, the current British Lightweight Champion. Sass defeated Sinclair by split decision.

Ultimate Fighting Championship
Sass signed a four-fight deal with the UFC, joining Kurt Warburton, Tom Blackledge and Rob Broughton as the new additions to the UFC roster.

In his UFC debut at UFC 120 he submitted Canadian Mark Holst in the first round with a Triangle Choke. Sass picked up Submission of the Night honors and a $60,000 bonus following the event.

Sass faced Michael Johnson on 1 October 2011 at UFC on Versus 6. Sass defeated Johnson in the first round via heel hook submission.

Sass was expected to face Evan Dunham on 28 January 2012 at UFC on Fox 2.  However, Sass was forced from the bout with an injury and replaced by Nik Lentz.

Sass defeated Jacob Volkmann on 26 May 2012 at UFC 146 via submission (triangle armbar).

Sass faced off against Matt Wiman on 26 September 2012 at UFC on Fuel TV: Struve vs. Miocic.  Wiman defeated Sass via first round submission (armbar).

Sass fought Danny Castillo on 16 February 2013 at UFC on Fuel TV: Barão vs. McDonald. Sass lost the fight via unanimous decision and was subsequently released from the promotion.

Bellator MMA
Sass signed with Bellator in May and made his debut at Bellator 104 in the autumn of 2013. He faced Rod Montoya in a lightweight contest and won via submission in the first round.

Championships and accomplishments

Grappling
Winner of Ground Control Grappling Tournament (Absolute Division)
Winner of Ren Bu Kai Grappling Tournament (Under 75k)

Mixed martial arts
OMMAC Lightweight Champion  
Runner Up – UK Rising Star (Cage Warriors 08 Awards)
 Ultimate Fighting Championship
Submission of the Night (Two times)

Mixed martial arts record

|-
|Win
|align=center|14–2
|Rod Montoya
|Submission (toe hold)
|Bellator 104
|
|align=center|1
|align=center|2:01
|Cedar Rapids, Iowa, US
|
|-
|Loss
|align=center|13–2
|Danny Castillo
|Decision (unanimous)
|UFC on Fuel TV: Barão vs. McDonald
|
|align=center|3
|align=center|5:00
|London, England, UK
|
|-
|Loss
|align=center|13–1
|Matt Wiman
|Submission (armbar)
|UFC on Fuel TV: Struve vs. Miocic
|
|align=center|1
|align=center|3:48 
|Nottingham, England, UK
|
|-
|Win
|align=center|13–0
|Jacob Volkmann
|Submission (triangle armbar)
|UFC 146
|
|align=center| 1
|align=center| 1:54
|Las Vegas, Nevada, US
|
|-
|Win
|align=center|12–0
|Michael Johnson
|Submission (inverted heel hook)
|UFC Live: Cruz vs. Johnson
|
|align=center| 1
|align=center| 3:00
|Washington, D.C., US
|
|-
|Win
|align=center| 11–0
|Mark Holst
|Submission (triangle choke)
|UFC 120
|
|align=center| 1
|align=center| 4:45
|London, England, UK
|
|-
|Win
|align=center| 10–0
|Jason Young
|Submission (heel hook)
|OMMAC 4: Victorious
|
|align=center| 1
|align=center| 2:01
|Liverpool, England, UK
|
|-
|Win
|align=center| 9–0
|Rob Sinclair
|Decision (split)
|OMMAC 2: Business As Usual
|
|align=center| 3
|align=center| 5:00
|Liverpool, England, UK
|
|-
|Win
|align=center| 8–0
|Ian Jones
|Submission (heel hook)
|OMMAC 1: Assassins
|
|align=center| 1
|align=center| 0:32
|Liverpool, England, UK
| 
|-
|Win
|align=center| 7–0
|Harvey Harra
|Submission (triangle choke)
|CG 11: Resurrection
|
|align=center| 1
|align=center| 2:15
|Liverpool, England, UK
| 
|-
|Win
|align=center| 6–0
|Jason Ball
|Submission (triangle choke)
|CG 10: Clash of the Titans
|
|align=center| 2
|align=center| 1:26
|Liverpool, England, UK
| 
|-
|Win
|align=center| 5–0
|Andrew Fisher
|Submission (triangle choke)
|CG 9: Beatdown
|
|align=center| 1
|align=center| 3:37
|Liverpool, England, UK
| 
|-
|Win
|align=center| 4–0
|Martin Stapleton
|Submission (triangle choke)
|Cage Gladiators 8
|
|align=center| 1
|align=center| 3:18
|Liverpool, England, UK
| 
|-
|Win
|align=center| 3–0
|Will Burke
|Submission (triangle choke)
|Cage Gladiators 7
|
|align=center| 1
|align=center| 1:04
|Liverpool, England, UK
| 
|-
|Win
|align=center| 2–0
|Steve Warris
|Submission (triangle choke)
|Cage Gladiators 5
|
|align=center| 1
|align=center| 2:31
|Liverpool, England, UK
| 
|-
|Win
|align=center| 1–0
|David Johnson
|Submission (triangle choke)
|Cage Gladiators 4
|
|align=center| 1
|align=center| 1:14
|Liverpool, England, UK
|

References

External links
Official UFC Profile

1988 births
British catch wrestlers
English male mixed martial artists
English Muay Thai practitioners
English practitioners of Brazilian jiu-jitsu
Lightweight mixed martial artists
Living people
Mixed martial artists utilizing Brazilian jiu-jitsu
Mixed martial artists utilizing catch wrestling
Mixed martial artists utilizing Luta Livre
Mixed martial artists utilizing Muay Thai
Martial artists from Liverpool
Ultimate Fighting Championship male fighters